German submarine U-219 was a Type XB submarine of Nazi Germany's Kriegsmarine during World War II.
 
The U-boat was laid down on 31 May 1941 at the Germaniawerft yard at Kiel as yard number 625, launched on 6 October 1942, and commissioned on 12 December 1942 under the command of Korvettenkapitän Walter Burghagen.

Operational history

First patrol
U-219 first ventured through the South Atlantic with the second Monsun Gruppe to the Indian Ocean in late 1943, having first rounded the British Isles and headed in a southerly direction west of Ireland.

U-219s mission had been to lay mines off Cape Town and Colombo, but when the group's U-tanker was destroyed, U-219 was required to take its place, refuelling the other submarines of the group at sea so they could return to Germany. Of this group, only U-510 continued to Penang Island. U-219 returned to France and was prepared for a transport mission at Bordeaux.

Second patrol
The boat was attacked five times by three Grumman Avengers from the aircraft carrier USS Tripoli west southwest of the Cape Verde Islands on 28 September. One aircraft was shot down.

Both U-219 and U-195 reached Batavia (now Jakarta), in December 1944.

In Japanese service
Following Germany's surrender, U-219 was seized by the Japanese at Batavia on 5 May 1945 and on 15 July it was placed into service with the Imperial Japanese Navy as I-505.

References

Bibliography

 Stevens, David, U-boat Far from Home, The Epic Voyage of U-862 to Australia and New Zealand, (1997), Allen & Unwin, 
 Beasant, John, Stalin's Silver: The Sinking of the USS John Barry, (1999), St. Martin's Press,

External links

 HIJMS Submarine I-505: Tabular Record of Movement

German Type X submarines
World War II submarines of Germany
Captured U-boats
Indian Ocean U-Boats
Minelayers
World War II submarines of Japan
Foreign submarines of the Imperial Japanese Navy
1942 ships
Ships built in Kiel
U-boats commissioned in 1942
Maritime incidents in 1946
Scuttled vessels